Dugout may refer to:
 Dugout (shelter), an underground shelter
 Dugout (boat), a logboat
 Dugout (smoking), a marijuana container

Sports
 In bat-and-ball sports, a dugout is one of two areas where players of the home or opposing teams sit when not at bat or in the field
 Dugout (baseball), a covered shelter near the diamond
 Dugout (cricket), an area at either end of the field
 In association football, the technical area contains the dugouts

Music
 Dug Out, the seventh album by the Japanese band The Blue Hearts

Places
 Dugout, West Virginia, USA